This list of museums in Suffolk, England contains museums which are defined for this context as institutions (including nonprofit organizations, government entities, and private businesses) that collect and care for objects of cultural, artistic, scientific, or historical interest and make their collections or related exhibits available for public viewing. Also included are non-profit art galleries and university art galleries.  Museums that exist only in cyberspace (i.e., virtual museums) are not included.

Museums

Defunct museums
 Sue Ryder Foundation Museum, Cavendish, life and works of philanthropist Sue Ryder
 Suffolk Heavy Horse Museum, Woodbridge, history of the Suffolk Punch breed of draught horse
  William Clowes Printing Museum, Beccles

See also
:Category:Tourist attractions in Suffolk

References

Explore Suffolk's Museums

 
Suffolk
Museums